Night and Day is a 1991 French drama film directed by Chantal Akerman.

Plot
Jack and Julie live together in Paris. They are a couple who are so in love with one another that they forget the rest of the world. Jack works as a taxi driver by night so he can be with Julie in the day. One day he introduces Julie to Joseph, who is a taxi driver by day. Joseph and Julie fall in love with each other and have an affair afterwards.

Cast 
 Guilaine Londez - Julie
 Thomas Langmann - Jack
 François Négret - Joseph
 Nicole Colchat - Jack's mother
 Pierre Laroche - Jack's father

References

External links 
 
 
 

1991 drama films
1991 films
French drama films
Films set in Paris
Films shot in Paris
Films directed by Chantal Akerman
1990s French films